Kitwana Rhymer (born 22 May 1978 in Saint Thomas, U.S. Virgin Islands) is a United States Virgin Islands basketball player currently with La Villa Basketball of the La Vega League in the Dominican Republic.

Rhymer was a four-year player for the University of Massachusetts Amherst from 1998-2002.  He graduated as the school's fifth-leading shot blocker and was the 2000-01 Atlantic 10 Conference Defensive Player of the Year.

Professional career
Since beginning his professional career in 2002, Rhymer has bounced through nine teams on four continents.  These include:

  Brooklyn Kings (USBL) (2002)
  Columbus Riverdragons (D-League) (2003)
  Westchester Wildfire (USBL) (2003–04)
  Great Lakes Storm (CBA) (2005)
  Waikato Pistons (2006)
  Long Island Primetime (USBL) (2006)
  Guaros de Lara (2006)
  Hanzevast Capitals Groningen (2006–07)
  Marinos de Anzoategui (2007–08)
  Kryvbasbasket-Lux Kryvyi Rih (2008–09)
  Gaz Metan Mediaş (2009–10)
  La Villa Basketball La Vega League (2010–17)
Brujos de Guayama, Baloncesto Superior  Nacional, 1 game, 2017

National team career

Rhymer is a long-time member of the Virgin Islands national basketball team.  He played with the team at the 1999, 2003, 2006, and 2008 Centrobasket tournaments.  The Virgin Islanders won the silver medal in each of the latter two Centrobasket tournaments.  He also participated with the team at the last place Virgin Islanders at both the FIBA Americas Championship 2007 and FIBA Americas Championship 2009.

References

1978 births
Living people
UMass Minutemen basketball players
United States Virgin Islands men's basketball players
United States Virgin Islands expatriate sportspeople
Basketball players at the 2007 Pan American Games
Pan American Games competitors for the United States Virgin Islands
People from Saint Thomas, U.S. Virgin Islands
Columbus Riverdragons players
Waikato Pistons players